Dihydrofolate reductase deficiency (DHFR deficiency) is a rare inherited disorder of folate metabolism caused by defects in the DHFR gene. The disorder is inherited in the autosomal recessive manner and may present with megaloblastic anemia, cerebral folate deficiency and neurological symptoms of varying type and severity. The patient may have a developmental delay and develop epileptic seizures.

Treatment

Folinic acid, a reduced form of folate, is used to correct the reduced 5-MTHF levels in the cerebrospinal fluid and the anemia. This reduces some symptoms of the disease.

History
DHFR deficiency was first described in 2011 by two different groups of scientists independently.

References

External links
 OMIM 613839 - description in the OMIM database

Metabolic disorders